Balbir Punj is an eminent journalist and columnist from India. For more than two and a half decades, Punj has been writing on current topics in important Hindi-English newspapers, magazines. He specializes in dealing with social, economic, and political issues.   He has also invited to speak on various subjects by many public fora and is known for his clarity and articulation.  Punj started his career in journalism for the publication Motherland in 1971. He also worked for Financial Express from 1974 to 1996. Then he worked for The Observer of Business and Politics (A business daily published from Delhi and Mumbai) as an Executive Editor for four years- from May 1996 to March 2000. He was also IIMC chairman for almost two years until March 2000. IIMC is the best-known organization in media training in entire Southeast Asia. Punj also had an important participation in the Delhi Journalists Association, where he served as the President for two consecutive terms between 1989 and 1991. In 1993–95, Punj worked as the General Secretary of the National Union of Journalists (NUJ). He was also chairman of the National Commission for Youth. He was also a member of the 'Delhi Finance Commission' established by the then Delhi Government in 1996–97. On May 18, 2022, Balbir Punj was honored with Lifelong Devrishi Narad Samman Award.

Columnist
Punj has written columns in the National English & Hindi Daily and Indian weekly magazine. Currently, he writes a regular column for the daily newspaper Punjab Kesari, Dainik Jagran, Amar Ujala and a host of regional papers. In English dailies, He occasionally writes for Hindustan Times, The Indian Express and "ThePrint" Until some time ago, balbir punj was also writing for years in “The New Indian Express”, Asian Age, Mail Today (India Today), Outlook, Sunday Standard, Andhra Jyoti, Lokmat Times, Gujarat Samachar, Sandesh, Chetna.

Major Contribution
In the past, Balbir Punj exposed Booker Prize winner and ultra-Leftist Arundhati Roy's lies in her 7-page-long (approx. 6000 words) article in Outlook titled Democracy: Who is she when she's at home?, dated 6 May 2002 on the violence in Gujarat. She wrote: "A mob surrounded the house of ex-Congress MP Iqbal Ehsan Jaffri. His phone calls to the director-general of police, the police commissioner, the chief secretary, the additional chief secretary (home) were ignored. The mobile police vans around his house did not intervene. The mob broke into the house. They stripped his daughters and burnt them alive. Then they beheaded Jaffri and dismembered him." The then Rajya Sabha MP Balbir Punj pointed out, the late Jafri's daughters didn't live in Gujarat – something that was also corroborated by his own son. T.A. Jafri, Jafri son, in a front-page interview titled Nobody knew my father's house was the target (The Asian Age, May 2, 2002, Delhi edition), says, "Among my brothers and sisters, I am the only one living in India. And I am the eldest in the family. My sister and brother live in the US. I am 40 years old and I have been born and brought up in Ahmedabad." As Punj noted: “When a reputed weekly like Outlook publishes a Booker Prize-winner, it is meant to be serious commentary.” In her that article, Arundhati also wrote: "Last night a friend from Baroda called. Weeping. It took her fifteen minutes to tell me what the matter was. It wasn't very complicated. Only that Sayeeda, a friend of hers, had been caught by a mob. Only that her stomach had been ripped open and stuffed with burning rags. Only that after she died, someone carved 'OM' on her forehead". Balbir Punj took up this incident in his rejoinder published as 'Dissimulation In Word and Images’ in Outlook, July 8, 2002. He wrote, "Shocked by this despicable "incident", the then BJP Rajya Sabha MP Balbir Punj got in touch with the Gujarat government. The police investigations revealed that no such case, involving someone called Sayeeda, had been reported either in urban or rural Baroda. Subsequently, the police sought Roy's help to identify the victim and seek access to witnesses who could lead them to those guilty of this crime. But the police got no cooperation. Instead, Roy, through her lawyer, replied that the police had no power to issue summons. Thus she hedged behind technical excuses?"

Balbir punj also exposes the political games over "Rohith Vemula" suicide case. In his Article, which was published in Outlook dated 15 Feb 2002, he wrote, "The weekly Outlook (February 1) had Rohith on cover and devoted 15 pages to his tragic end and in analyzing the problems of Dalits.  Articles and interviews were galore on the subject – of course with a pre-determined common theme. But surprisingly, the magazine did not carry the text of Rohith’s suicide note – without doubt the most important document in this glum episode. Why? Was it because Rohith’s last words would not fit into the secular narrative?... Rohith’s note reads “the value of a man was reduced to his immediate identity and nearest possibility. To a vote. To a number. To a thing. Never was a man treated as a mind.” Now juxtapose this against the portion which has been struck off where he says “ASA, SFI, anything and everything exist for their own sake. Seldom the interest of a person and this organization match. To get power, to become famous or to be important in between boundaries and to think we are up to changing the system. Very often we overestimate the acts and find solace in trails. Of course I must give credit to both groups for making, introducing me to wonderful literature and people.” “I myself strike these words,” he wrote below these lines and signed. But did Rohith really strike off these lines? Or someone else?  And if so, why? Rohith after concluding his last missive, however, added a post-script “No one is responsible for my this act of killing myself. No one has instigated me, whether by their acts or by their words to this act. This is my decision and I am the only one responsible for this. Do not trouble my friends and enemies on this after I am gone”. And what all his so-called friends are doing after his death? Using the tragedy to further their political and ideological agenda!" A Booklet called "Communists and Jehadists at Work in JNU" was also edited by Balbir Punj.

In April 2022, Punj made a claim about Mahmud of Ghazni. Punj had written Mahmud of Ghazni "took a vow to wage jihad every year against Indian idolators". According to historian Narayani Gupta, History of Mischief, on April 25, 2022, Punj had made a similar claim on 12 July 2019 and ‘’there was no other historical source with such a claim’’. Both articles sparked a debate in social media about Ghazni. Punj then wrote 'Letter to the Editor' of the Indian Express in the reference to his claims that "I am grateful to Ms. Narayani Gupta for her informed feedback to my article "Ignorance Isn’t bliss". I am glad that she has reproduced a large part of my article in her rejoinder, giving me a yet another opportunity to reconnect with the readers. A little objective perusal of history can help us with the relevant source for Mahmud of Ghazni who “took a vow to wage jihad every year against Indian idolators”. Please refer to “The Age of Wrath” by Abraham Eraly. A number of accounts about the intent and destructive actions of Mahmud are available. His contemporary, Al-Biruni says: “He utterly ruined the prosperity of the country (of India), and performed those wonderful exploits by which the Hindus became like atoms of dust scattered in all directions” (‘Alberuni’s India’ edited by Edward & Sachau). According to the Tarikh-e-Sultan Mahmud-e-Ghaznavi Or the History of Sultan Mahmud of Ghazni' (Translated 1908) by George Roos-Keppel, Qazi Abdul Ghani Khan, when offered a huge ransom by a vanquished Hindu king, Mahmud replied, "In the religion of the Musalmans it is (laid down that this is) a meritorious act that anyone who may destroy the place of worship of the heathen he will reap great reward on the day of judgment, and my intention is to remove entirely idols from the cities of Hindustan". I am not a historian. Does one have to be a historian to recall the horrors of 1947, destruction of temples of Kashi, Mathura and Ayodhya or near complete decimation of non-Muslims in Afghanistan, Pakistan & Kashmir Valley?"

Political career

Punj is not only a columnist but also an active political worker. He was a former member of Rajya Sabha for two terms. He was Bharatiya Janata Party (BJP)'s Rajya Sabha MP from Uttar Pradesh from 2000 to 2006. In 2008, Balbir Punj was again elected a member of Rajya Sabha from Odisha and retired in 2014. He was also the convener of the Intellectual Cell of the BJP for a decade, helping the party to chart out its ideological course. He was also chairman of the National Commission for Youth (Minister of State status). On 31 March 2013, he was promoted as one of the Vice Presidents of the Bharatiya Janata Party (BJP). Punj has also served BJP party as its national secretary, and as in charge of several states, including Gujarat, Punjab, Kerala and Himachal Pradesh. Member of BJP's National Executive from 2000 to 2014. He is a board member (Non-Official) of Bishweshwar Prasad Koirala India-Nepal Foundation (BPKF) under Ministry of External Affairs, India since July 2017. He is described as a close associate of the Rashtriya Swayamsevak Sangh. Punj can be often seen on news channels debating issues.

References

Living people
Bharatiya Janata Party politicians from Punjab
Indian male journalists
1949 births
People from Gurdaspur district
Rajya Sabha members from Uttar Pradesh
Rajya Sabha members from Odisha